The Bakersfield Train Robbers are a professional baseball team based in Bakersfield, California. The team is a member of the Pecos League, an independent baseball league which is not affiliated with Major or Minor League Baseball.

History 

Established for the 2013 season, the team played its home games at Lake Shawnee Sports Complex. The team previously called Las Vegas, New Mexico, home for two seasons, then played the 2015 season as a travel team before moving to Topeka.  On December 15, 2016, it was announced that the Train Robbers would move to Bakersfield for the 2017 season, filling in the void left by the contraction of the California League's Bakersfield Blaze.

Roster

Season-by-season results

References

External links
 Bakersfield Train Robbers website

Pecos League teams
Professional baseball teams in California
Baseball teams established in 2016
2016 establishments in California
Sports in Bakersfield, California